Destroyer is the fourth studio album by American hard rock band Kiss, released on March 15, 1976, by Casablanca Records in the US. It was the third successive Kiss album to reach the top 40 in the US, as well as the first to chart in Germany and New Zealand. The album was certified gold by the RIAA on April 22, 1976, and platinum on November 11 of the same year, the first Kiss album to achieve platinum. The album marked a departure from the raw sound of the band's first three albums.

Background
After attaining modest commercial success with their first three studio albums, Kiss achieved a commercial breakthrough with the 1975 concert album Alive! It was the first album by the band to be certified gold. The success of Alive!, which spent 110 weeks on the charts, benefited not only the struggling band but also their cash-strapped label Casablanca Records. Kiss signed a new contract with Casablanca in late 1975, partly because the label had been very supportive from the start of the band's career. The contract was for two albums, an indication that Casablanca was unsure if the group could duplicate the accomplishments of Alive!

Songwriting and recording

Rehearsals for Destroyer began in August 1975, while the group was embarked on their supporting tour for Alive! Bob Ezrin, who had previously worked with Alice Cooper, was brought in to produce the album. The band felt that Ezrin was the right person to help them take their sound to the next level and to maintain the commercial success they had achieved with Alive! Before meeting with Ezrin, the band had written and recorded a 15-song demo in the Magna Graphics Studio in August 1975. The first demo recorded during the Destroyer sessions was "Ain't None of Your Business" featuring Peter Criss on vocals. The plodding, heavy song, written by country songwriters Becky Hobbs and Lew Anderson, was rejected by the band and later appeared on the 1977 debut album by Michael Des Barres' band Detective. Although this song was rejected, other outside songs and suggestions were accepted by the band. In particular, Kim Fowley and Mark Anthony became important contributors during the songwriting process., bringing in the title and basic structure of the song "King of the Night Time World" from their previous band Hollywood Stars' then-unreleased 1974 album Shine Like a Radio (which also featured the original version of the Alice Cooper song "Escape" from Welcome to My Nightmare).

Ezrin flat out rejected most of the material, as only heavily re-worked versions of "God of Thunder" and "Detroit Rock City" made it to the album, and one song "Mad Dog" was pilfered for lyrics to "Sweet Pain" and a riff for "Flaming Youth". Other songs from this demo were re-worked for the following album Rock and Roll Over and Gene Simmons' 1978 solo album while others remained unreleased until the 2021 release of Destroyer as a 2CD set and Super Deluxe box set.

The first recording sessions for the album took place on September 3–6, 1975 at Electric Lady Studios in New York City, during a brief break between the Dressed to Kill and Alive! tours. The basic album tracks were recorded during this time. The majority of the recording sessions for Destroyer took place in January 1976, after the conclusion of the Alive! tour. Ezrin introduced to Kiss sound effects, strings, screaming children, reversed drums (on "God of Thunder") and a children's choir. The song "Great Expectations" uses the first phrase of the main theme from the second movement of Beethoven's Piano Sonata No. 8 in C minor, Op. 13 (known as Sonata Pathétique), but the songwriting is credited to Simmons and Ezrin.

During the recording sessions, Ezrin resorted to numerous tactics designed to increase the quality of music Kiss recorded. Because none of the group were trained musicians, Ezrin halted the sessions at one point to provide lessons in basic music theory. To instill a sense of discipline, he wore a whistle around his neck and exhorted the band with sayings such as, "Campers, we're going to work!" When Simmons stopped playing during the recording of an outro, Ezrin yelled at him, saying, "Don't you ever stop a take unless I tell you!"

Paul Stanley later compared the experience of working with Ezrin as "musical boot camp" but said that the group "came out a lot smarter for it." Simmons echoed the sentiment by stating, "It was exactly what we needed at the time."

Destroyer is the first Kiss album to prominently feature outside musicians, such as members of the New York Philharmonic. One musician not credited was Dick Wagner, from Alice Cooper's band, replacing Ace Frehley on the track "Sweet Pain". Wagner also played the acoustic guitar found on the song "Beth". The success of Alive! and Destroyer enabled the band to embark on their first tour of Europe.

Artwork
The cover art for Destroyer was painted by fantasy artist Ken Kelly. Kelly was invited to a show and given a backstage pass. He said of the performance, "It blew me away." Kelly was later commissioned by the band to draw the cover for 1977's Love Gun.

Kelly's original version of the album cover was rejected by the record company because they felt the scene was too violent looking with the rubble and flames. Also, the original version had the members of Kiss wearing the Alive! costumes. The front cover shows the group striding on top of a pile of rubble, and a desolate background spotted with destroyed buildings, some of which are engulfed in flames. The back cover shows a similar scene, but with more buildings on fire. The front of the inner sleeve featured a large Kiss logo and the lyrics to "Detroit Rock City". The other side displayed the lyric "Shout it out loud", as well as an advertisement for the Kiss Army fan club.

Destroyer: Resurrected
In anticipation of the 35th anniversary of the release of Destroyer, producer Bob Ezrin approached Simmons and Stanley about doing a remix and re-release of the original album. With their approval, Ezrin acquired digital copies of the original 16-track analog master tapes. In addition to re-equalizing elements of each song, Ezrin also added in some parts of tracks that had been omitted from the original mix. These include some additional vocals on "Detroit Rock City" and "Beth", and the substitution of a guitar solo by Frehley on "Sweet Pain" for the one from the original that had been performed by Wagner (a version of "Sweet Pain" with Frehley's solo was included as track 6, while the original version with Wagner's solo is appended as a "bonus" track at the end of the new CD). Ezrin also used digital manipulation to fix an incorrect lyric (changing "down 95" to "doin' 95") on "Detroit Rock City". The resulting album, titled Destroyer: Resurrected, was released on August 21, 2012. It featured Ken Kelly's original cover artwork before alteration by Casablanca for the 1976 release.

Destroyer: Resurrected met with mixed critical reception. William Clark of Guitar International wrote: "Each track sounds crisper, clearer and louder, which are always welcome qualities when you’re listening to a classic album of the likes of Destroyer". However, Circus magazine in a joint review with Aerosmith's contemporary release of Rocks praised Rocks while stating that Destroyer "stinks." The album returned to the Billboard charts, debuting at No. 11 the week after its re-release. In 2019, the record was released in orange translucent vinyl, retailed exclusively by Walmart in the U.S..

Reception

Destroyer sold well upon its release on March 15, 1976, and was certified gold on April 22. Although exact sales figures are not known, Stanley stated that the album initially sold 850,000 copies in the US, well over any of Kiss's first three studio albums. After peaking at No. 11 on the Billboard 200 album chart on May 15, Destroyer quickly fell and by August was at No. 192. The first three singles—"Shout It Out Loud", "Flaming Youth" and "Detroit Rock City"—failed to ignite sales any further, though "Shout It Out Loud" did give the band their first No. 1 record, in Canada. The band and Ezrin cited fan backlash as the reason Destroyer did not meet sales expectations. Ezrin also stated that the "grassroots rock press" was particularly critical of the album. Rolling Stone referred to "bloated ballads", "pedestrian drumming" and "lackluster performances" in its review. Robert Christgau, writing in The Village Voice, felt that it was Kiss's "least interesting record" and criticized producer Ezrin for adding "only bombast and melodrama". It was not until radio stations started playing the B-side of the "Detroit Rock City" single "Beth", that the album started to sell as expected. The ballad, which according to Simmons was deliberately put on the B-side to force stations to play "Detroit Rock City", started receiving numerous listener requests and became an unexpected hit. "Beth" (co-written and sung by Peter Criss) was re-released as the fourth single in late August, and it peaked at No. 7 on the Billboard Hot 100 singles chart on September 25. It was the group's first Top 10 song and reignited sales of the album. 

On November 11, 1976 Destroyer became the first Kiss album to be certified platinum. The album was re-certified at the double platinum level on September 9, 2011 and is the band's best selling in the post-1991 Soundscan era, selling 726,000 copies in the United States from 1991 to March 4, 2012.

The album has received recognition in later years. In 1989, Kerrang! magazine listed the album at No. 36 among the "100 Greatest Heavy Metal Albums of All Time". In The Rolling Stone Album Guide (2004), Rob Sheffield referred to Destroyer as "the inevitable arty concept album, from the drink-smoke-drive-die saga 'Detroit Rock City' to the touching 'Do You Love Me?'". The album was also featured in 1001 Albums You Must Hear Before You Die. In 2006, it was placed at No. 60 on Guitar World magazine's list of the 100 Greatest Guitar Albums of All Time. Greg Prato of AllMusic described Destroyer as "one of Kiss' most experimental studio albums, but also one of their strongest and most interesting." Pitchfork's Jason Josephes said that it is "easily one of the best albums in the Kiss canon" and credited Ezrin for ushering along "even more of an art/hard rock album than Kiss's previous efforts." Canadian journalist Martin Popoff, described Destroyer as a "no party album, looming darkly, ponderous, almost haunting at times, basically uncommunicative and puzzling due to its stylistic over-extension" and judged it a "success of early no-chops metal". In 2012, Rolling Stone ranked it at No. 489 on its list of the 500 greatest albums of all time, calling it "a ridiculously over-the-top party-rock album that just gets better with age".

Track listing

Original release
All credits adapted from the original releases.

 Rock and Roll Demons/Rock and Roll Party appears a few seconds after "Do You Love Me?" as a hidden track on the original vinyl pressing.

Destroyer: Resurrected (2012 remix)

 Sweet Pain (track 6) solo by Ace Frehley, previously unreleased
 Sweet Pain (track 11) - Solo by Dick Wagner, from the original release

Personnel
Kiss
Paul Stanley – vocals, rhythm guitar
Gene Simmons – vocals, bass
Peter Criss – drums, vocals
Ace Frehley – lead guitar, backing vocals

Additional musicians
Dick Wagner – guitar solo on "Sweet Pain", guitar licks on "Flaming Youth", acoustic guitar on "Great Expectations" and "Beth"
Brooklyn Boys Chorus – additional vocals on "Great Expectations"
David and Josh Ezrin – voices on "God of Thunder"
New York Philharmonic – orchestra on "Beth"

Production
Bob Ezrin – producer, orchestration, keyboards, piano on "Beth"
H.A. Macmillan – orchestration
Jay Messina, Corky Stasiak – engineers

Charts

Album

Singles

Certifications

Accolades
The following information regarding list placements attributed to Destroyer is taken from Acclaimed Music.

Release history

References

Bibliography

External links
 

Kiss (band) albums
1976 albums
Albums produced by Bob Ezrin
Albums recorded at Electric Lady Studios
Albums recorded at Record Plant (New York City)
Casablanca Records albums
Concept albums
Albums with cover art by Ken Kelly (artist)